Achar is a village in the Tacuarembó Department of northern-central Uruguay.

Geography

History
On 21 August 1936, the status of the populated centre here was elevated to "Pueblo" (village) by the Act of Ley Nº 9.587.

Population
In 2011 Achar had a population of 687.
 
Source: Instituto Nacional de Estadística de Uruguay

Places of worship
 St. Joseph Parish Church (Roman Catholic)

Mars
The name Achar has been used for a crater on the planet Mars by the International Astronomical Union, although not specifically commemorating the village.

References

External links
INE map of Achar

Populated places in the Tacuarembó Department